Chiyli is an impact crater in Kazakhstan.

It is 5.5 km in diameter and the age is estimated to be 46 ± 7 million years (Eocene). The crater is exposed at the surface.

References

External links 
 Chiyli Crater at NASA Earth Observatory

Impact craters of Kazakhstan
Eocene impact craters
Lutetian Stage
Ypresian Stage